Sibylle of Cleves (17 January 1512 – 21 February 1554) was electress consort of Saxony.

Born in Düsseldorf, she was the eldest daughter of John III of the House of La Marck, Duke of Jülich jure uxoris, Cleves, Berg jure uxoris, Count of Mark, also known as de la Marck and Ravensberg jure uxoris (often referred to as Duke of Cleves) who died in 1538, and his wife Maria, Duchess of Julich-Berg (1491–1543). Her younger siblings were two sisters, Anne (later Queen of England) and Amalia, and a brother, William, who became Duke of Jülich-Cleves-Berg.

Life
In September 1526, Sibylle was betrothed to Electoral Prince John Frederick of Saxony in the Schloss Burg an der Wupper. After lengthy negotiations about the dowry, the lavish wedding ceremony, preceded by an elaborate procession, took place in Torgau on 9 February 1527. They had four sons.

After the death of his father in 1532, Johann Friedrich became the elector of Saxony and Sibylle the electress.

The correspondence between Sibylle and her husband during his captivity as a consequence of the Schmalkaldic War, showed a devoted and intimate couple. In the meanwhile, during the siege of Wittenberg, the electress protected the city in her husband's absence. To save his wife and sons, and to prevent Wittenberg from being destroyed, John Frederick conceded the Capitulation of Wittenberg and resigned the government of his country in favor of Maurice of Saxony.

In 1552, after five years of captivity, the deposed elector was finally reunited with his family. However, the reunion was short-lived: in 1554 both Sibylle and Johan Frederick I died within a month of each other. They were buried in the City Church of Weimar.

Like her husband, Sibylle was a staunch supporter of the Reformation. The Thuringian reformer Justus Menius dedicated to her the mirrors for princes writing Oeconomia Christiana.

Issue
John Frederick II, Duke of Saxony (b. Torgau, 8 January 1529 – d. as imperial prisoner at Schloss Steyr, Upper Austria, 19 May 1595).
John William, Duke of Saxe-Weimar (b. Torgau, 11 March 1530 – d. Weimar, 2 March 1573).
John Ernest (b. Weimar, 5 January 1535 – d. Weimar, 11 January 1535).
John Frederick III, Duke of Saxony, called the Younger (b. Torgau, 16 January 1538 – d. Jena, 31 October 1565).

Notes

References
Faith and Power: Saxony in Europe during the Reformation period, Dresden 2004, p. 149. 
Joachim Bauer/Dagmar Blaha: The deaths of John Frederick and his wife Sibylle, in: Sächsische Heimatblätter 50 (2004), vol. I, pp. 78–84.
Carl August Hugo Burkhardt: Letters of Sybille of Jülich-Cleves-Berg to her husband John Frederick the Magnanimous, Elector of Saxony, in: Journal of the Berg Historical Society, vol. V, 1868, pp. 1–184.
Sylvia Weigelt: "The men pleasure and joy to be": women to Luther. Wartburg 2011.
Heinrich Theodor Flathe: Electress of Saxony, in: Allgemeine Deutsche Biographie (ADB). vol. 34, Duncker & Humblot, Leipzig 1892, p. 141.

External links

People from the Duchy of Cleves
House of La Marck
House of Wettin
Nobility from Düsseldorf
1512 births
1554 deaths
Duchesses of Saxony
Electresses of Saxony
Women in 16th-century warfare
Women in European warfare
16th-century letter writers